This is an index of DOS games.

This list has been split into multiple pages. Please use the Table of Contents to browse it.

DOS games
DOS